The Goat, or Who Is Sylvia? is a full-length play written in 2000 by Edward Albee which opened on Broadway in 2002. It won the 2002 Tony Award for Best Play, the 2002 Drama Desk Award for Outstanding Play, and was a finalist for the 2003 Pulitzer Prize for Drama.

Overview
The tale of a married, middle-aged architect, Martin, his wife Stevie, and their son Billy, whose lives crumble when Martin falls in love with a goat, the play focuses on the limits of an ostensibly liberal society. Through showing this family in crisis, Albee challenges audience members to question their own moral judgment of social taboos.

The play also features many language games and grammatical arguments in the middle of catastrophes and existential disputes between the characters. The name of the play refers to the song "Who Is Silvia?" from Shakespeare's play The Two Gentlemen of Verona. Proteus sings this song, hoping to woo Silvia. It is also referred to in Finding the Sun (1982), an earlier work of Albee.

Characters
 Stevie Gray: the wife of Martin who, until Sylvia, had been his one and only love
 Martin Gray: a 50-year-old award-winning architect who falls in love with a goat
 Billy Gray: Stevie and Martin's gay, emotionally sensitive, 17-year-old son
 Ross Tuttle: a family friend and host of a television program

Plot

Scene 1 
It is Martin's 50th birthday. In his suburban living room, he and his wife Stevie prepare to be interviewed on television by their friend Ross. Martin seems distracted and cannot remember anything. Stevie casually asks Martin about a woman's business card in his pocket and his odd scent. Martin denies having an affair with a woman, but confesses to falling in love with a goat named Sylvia. Stevie laughs it off, thinking it is a joke. Stevie leaves when Ross arrives. Ross begins interviewing Martin, congratulating him for being the youngest man ever to win the Pritzker Prize and recently being chosen to design a multi-billion-dollar city. However, Ross soon becomes frustrated with Martin’s inability to concentrate on the interview. Martin confides that the reason for his absent-mindedness is his affair with Sylvia, which began during his search for a country home. Amazed that Martin could fall in love with anyone but Stevie, Ross asks repeatedly, "Who is Sylvia?" Martin reveals a photo of Sylvia and Ross screams that Sylvia is a goat.

Scene 2 
Ross has written Stevie a letter regarding Martin's affair and Sylvia's identity. Stevie confronts Martin about this, with their son Billy also in the room. Billy is shocked and flees (throughout this scene, he enters and exits sporadically). Stevie recounts the normalcy of her life before she opened Ross's letter. She realizes that Martin was telling the truth in Scene 1 and that she was right to worry about the business card and the odd scent. The card belongs to a member of a support group for bestiality. Martin claims that people like him seek animal company as a coping mechanism. For him, Sylvia is not just an animal; she has a soul and reciprocates his love. As Martin tries to justify himself, Stevie breaks various objects and overturns furniture. Finally, she exits, vowing revenge.

Scene 3 
Billy enters the ruined living room where Martin remains. Billy claims that Martin and Stevie are good people and are better than most of his classmates' parents. However, he begins crying once he realizes that Martin's bestiality has torn their once happy family apart beyond repair. 

Overwhelmed with a sense of loss and love for his father, Billy embraces Martin and kisses him sexually on the mouth. Martin pushes Billy away just as Ross enters to witness the scene. Martin angrily defends both his son and himself. Ross says he received a call from Stevie saying Martin needed him. Ross and Martin spar over Ross's letter and how Martin's public image can be saved from disgrace. 

Stevie then enters, dragging a dead goat. She killed Sylvia because she could not stand the idea that she and Sylvia loved Martin equally and were loved as equally by him. Ross freezes and Martin breaks down. The scene ends with Billy crying out.

Tragedy
Albee places parentheses around the play's subtitle: "Notes toward a definition of tragedy". The original Greek meaning of the word tragedy is "goat-song". The play maintains Aristotle's six elements of a tragedy in addition to the three unities. The play's resemblance to a Greek tragedy continues as Greek theater is linked to Dionysus. As the god of ritual madness, he inspires ecstasy that frees his followers from fears and subverts hegemony. Bestiality is considered taboo in contemporary society. Martin's relationship with Sylvia thus defies convention. Unlike the other members in the support group, Martin does not understand why bestiality is wrong when he practices it devoid of previous trauma.

On the other hand, Stevie resembles a maenad with her increasingly frenzied actions. The play also alludes to the Eumenides. Before the interview starts, Ross hears "a kind of...rushing sound...wings, or something," to which Martin replies, "It's probably the Eumenides." The noise disappears and Martin corrects himself because "[the Eumenides] don't stop." The allusion foreshadows Stevie's vow for vengeance, carried out to conclude the play.

The Goat is also a problem play. Albee questions, among other concepts, social morality in relation to taboos, the perception of female identity by contrasting Stevie to Sylvia, and the arbitrary nature of social standards and conventions by juxtaposing Martin's distaste for homosexuality with his bestiality.

Productions
The play premiered on Broadway at the John Golden Theatre on March 10, 2002, and closed on December 15, 2002, after 309 performances and 23 previews. Directed by David Esbjornson, the cast featured Bill Pullman (Martin), Mercedes Ruehl (Stevie), Jeffrey Carlson (Billy), and Stephen Rowe (Ross). On September 13, 2002, Bill Irwin took on the role of Martin, and Sally Field took the role of Stevie.

The European premiere took place at Vienna's English Theatre in March to May 2003. Directed by Pam MacKinnon, the cast was Laurence Lau (Martin), Jurian Hughes (Stevie), Howard Nightingall (Ross), and Michael Zlabinger (Billy).

The play ran in the UK at the Almeida Theatre in Islington from 3 February to 13 March 2004 and transferred to the West End at the Apollo Theatre on April 15, 2004, closing on August 7, 2004. Directed by Anthony Page, the cast featured Jonathan Pryce (Martin), Kate Fahy (Stevie), Matthew Marsh (Ross),  and Eddie Redmayne (Billy).

The play was produced in NSW, Australia by the State Theatre of South Australia at the Seymour Centre (Sydney), from April 6 to May 7, 2006. Directed by Marion Potts, the cast featured William Zappa, Victoria Longley, Cameron Goodall and Pip Miller.

The play was produced at TheaterWorks Hartford from April 2 to May 23, 2004, directed by Rob Ruggiero.  

The play was produced in Ottawa at the Great Canadian Theatre Company under the direction of Lorne Pardy, October 28 to November 14, 2004. The cast included Stewart Arnott as Martin, Dixie Seatle as Stevie, Peter Mooney as Billy, and Dennis Fitzgerald as Ross.

A new production directed by Ian Rickson and starring Damian Lewis, Sophie Okonedo, Jason Hughes and Archie Madekwe opened at the Theatre Royal Haymarket in London's West End, in 2017.

A new production by Sydney Theatre Company opened at the Ros Packer Theatre, Sydney in March 2023, featuring Claudia Karvan, Yazeed Daher, Nathan Page, and Mark Saturno.

Awards and nominations
The play was a finalist for the 2003 Pulitzer Prize for Drama (won that year by Anna in the Tropics).

Awards
 2002 Drama Desk Award, Outstanding New Play
 2002 Tony Award for Best Play

Nominations
 2002 Tony Award, Best Actress in a Play (Ruehl)
 2002 Drama Desk Award, Outstanding Actor in a Play (Pullman)
 2002 Drama Desk Award, Outstanding Actress in a Play (Ruehl)
 2003 Pulitzer Prize for Drama
 2006 Helpmann Award for Best Play

References

External links
 
 
 Edward Albee renews the structure of Aristotelian tragedy on Literatured.com

2002 plays
Broadway plays
Drama Desk Award-winning plays
LGBT-related plays
Plays by Edward Albee
Tony Award-winning plays